The 2012 International GTSprint Series season was the third year of the International GTSprint Series. The season began at Monza on 1 April and finished at Pergusa on 28 October. Andrea Palma won the championship, driving a Ferrari.

Teams and drivers

Calendar and results
The Pergusa round was to be held in Portimão on 16 September, but it was canceled on 30 June.

Championship Standings

Drivers' championship

† - Drivers did not finish the race, but were classified as they completed over 50% of the race distance.

Teams' championship

GTS2 Class

GTS3 Class

External links
Official Superstars website

International GTSprint Series
Superstars Series seasons